Šimon Šmehýl (born 9 February 1994) is a Slovak football forward who currently plays for KFC Komárno.

FC Nitra
He made his professional debut for FC Nitra against FK Dukla Banská Bystrica on 10 November 2012.

External links

Eurofotbal profile

References

1994 births
Living people
Slovak footballers
Association football forwards
FC Nitra players
FK Senica players
Spartak Myjava players
FK Dukla Banská Bystrica players
FC ŠTK 1914 Šamorín players
1. SC Znojmo players
FK Baník Sokolov players
1. SK Prostějov players
KFC Komárno players
Slovak Super Liga players
2. Liga (Slovakia) players
Czech National Football League players
Sportspeople from Topoľčany